Hawas ("Lust") is an Indian Hindi erotic thriller film released in 2004. It is an adaptation of the 2002 American film Unfaithful. Hawas is directed by Karan Razdan and stars Meghna Naidu, Shawar Ali and Tarun Arora.

Cast
 Shawar Ali as Raj Mittal
 Tarun Arora as Karan Rastogi
 Meghna Naidu as Sapna Raj Mittal
 Mukesh Tiwari as Dubai Police inspector Rashid 
 Vivek Shauq as assan, Assistant of Inspector Rashid
 Madina as Arabian actress in guest role in item song "Amma Mia"
 Noora as Arabian actress in guest role in item song "Amma Mia"

Music
"Teri Chahat Me" (Male) - Babul Supriyo
"Tera Libaas" (II) - Sonu Nigam, Shreya Ghoshal		
"Teri Chahat Me" (Female) - Sunidhi Chauhan
"Alla Miya" -[Sunidhi Chauhan, Daboo Malik
"Churaya Hai Teri Nazar" - Shreya Ghoshal, Babul Supriyo
"Tera Libaas Ban Jaau" - Shreya Ghoshal, Babul Supriyo

Critical reception
Taran Adarsh of IndiaFM gave the film 2 stars out of 5, writing ″On the whole, HAWAS is a notch above the ordinary. And with sex, sleaze and skin-show as its trump cards, besides a mass appealing title, it has chances of scoring well at the ticket window, mainly at the small centers.″ Shruti Bhasin of Planet Bollywood wrote ″Overall, watch Hawas as a time-pass film. But if you want to see a better quality product of a similar theme, check out Murder or rent the original Hollywood flick Unfaithful.″ Rama Sharma of The Tribune (Chandigarh) wrote ″ “Hawas” is another film riding on the wave of sexual permissiveness. It is another matter that these themes are not handled with sensitivity. In the absence of good scripts, most of these like “Hawas” end up mocking at the man-woman relationship.″

References

External links

2004 films
2000s Hindi-language films
2000s erotic thriller films
Indian erotic thriller films
Films scored by Daboo Malik
Films shot in Dubai
Films set in Dubai
Indian remakes of American films